Joseph Kangaki Nabuai is a politician from Autonomous Region of Bougainville. He is a member of the Bougainville House of Representatives.

Biography
Nabuai was elected as a member of the Bougainville House of Representatives from Lule in 2015.

References

Living people
Members of the Bougainville House of Representatives
Year of birth missing (living people)